Broca's Brain: Reflections on the Romance of Science is a 1979 book by the astrophysicist Carl Sagan. Its chapters were originally articles published between 1974 and 1979 in various magazines, including The Atlantic Monthly, The New Republic, Physics Today, Playboy, and Scientific American.  In the introduction, Sagan wrote:

Title
The title essay is named in honor of the French physician, anatomist and anthropologist Paul Broca (1824–1880). He is best known for his discovery that different functions are assigned to different parts of the brain. He believed that by studying the brains of cadavers and correlating the known experiences of the former owners of the organs, human behavior could eventually be discovered and understood. To that end, he saved hundreds of human brains in jars of formalin; among the collection is his own brain. When Sagan finds it in the Musée de l'Homme, he poses questions that challenge some core ideas of human existence such as "How much of that man known as Paul Broca can still be found in this jar?"—a question that evokes both religious and scientific argument.

Contents
A major part of the book is devoted to debunking "paradoxers" who either live at the edge of science or are outright charlatans. An example of this is the controversy surrounding Immanuel Velikovsky's ideas presented in the book Worlds in Collision. Another large part of the book discusses naming conventions for the members of our solar system and their physical features. Sagan also discusses science fiction at some length. Here, he mentions Robert A. Heinlein as being one of his favorite science fiction authors in his childhood. Near death experiences and their cultural ambiguity is another topic of the essays. Sagan also criticizes ideas developed in Robert K. G. Temple's book The Sirius Mystery, published three years earlier in 1975.

In the final section of the book, "Ultimate Questions", Sagan writes:

Reception
Kirkus Reviews stated that, as an essayist, Sagan was "no Bronowski", and overall judged the collection to be "a mixed, often surprising bag of treats".

People considered that—aside from the "strangely touching" chapter about Broca's preserved brain—the book as a whole "rambles", with "plenty of science ... but little romance."

References

1979 non-fiction books
American non-fiction books
English-language books
Random House books
Science books
Scientific skepticism mass media
Works by Carl Sagan
Books about Dogon religion